Josef Jandač (born November 12, 1968 in Beroun) is a Czech ice hockey former coach of the Czech national team.

References

External links

1968 births
Czech ice hockey coaches
Czech Republic men's national ice hockey team coaches
Living people
People from Beroun
Ice hockey coaches at the 2018 Winter Olympics
Sportspeople from the Central Bohemian Region